DU-41165, also known as 6-fluoro-16-methylene-17α-acetoxy-δ6-retroprogesterone, is a progestin which was developed by Philips-Duphar in the 1970s and was never marketed. It is a combined derivative of 17α-hydroxyprogesterone and retroprogesterone. The drug shows extremely high potency as a progestogen in animals. It has been found to possess 158% of the relative binding affinity of promegestone for the progesterone receptor expressed in rat uterus (relative to 74% for the closely related progestin DU-41164). DU-41165 also showed 28% of the affinity of RU-28362 for the glucocorticoid receptor expressed in rat liver, but no affinity for the mineralocorticoid receptor expressed in rat kidney (<0.003% of that of RU-26752). The drug showed no androgenic, anabolic, or estrogenic activity in animals, but did show some antiandrogenic and glucocorticoid activity at high doses. Although highly potent in animals, DU-41165 produced little or no progestogenic effect at dosages of 50 and 200 µg/day in women, suggesting major species differences. DU-41165 has been studied as a potential photoaffinity label for the progesterone receptor.

References

Abandoned drugs
Acetate esters
Diketones
Fluoroarenes
Glucocorticoids
Pregnanes
Progestogens
Steroidal antiandrogens
Enones
Conjugated dienes
Vinylidene compounds